Kant on Practical Life: From Duty to History is a 2013 book by Kristi Sweet in which she offers "a synoptic overview of Kant's practical thought".

References

External links 
 Kant on Practical Life: From Duty to History

2013 non-fiction books
Books about Immanuel Kant
Cambridge University Press books
Ethics books